Phenix City is a city in Lee and Russell counties in the U.S. state of Alabama, and the county seat of Russell County. As of the 2020 Census, the population of the city was 38,817.

Phenix City lies immediately west across the Chattahoochee River from Columbus, Georgia and observes Eastern Time on a de facto basis (in contrast to the rest of Alabama, which observes Central Time) due to Phenix City's strong economic ties to Columbus. Most of Phenix City is included in the Columbus Metropolitan Statistical Area, and the remainder is in Lee County and therefore included in the Auburn, Alabama Metropolitan Statistical Area. The entire city is part of the Columbus-Auburn-Opelika Combined Statistical Area.

In 2007, BusinessWeek named Phenix City the nation's No. 1 Best Affordable Suburb to raise a family.  It is home to Chattahoochee Valley Community College, a public, two-year college with an acceptance rate of 100%.  Troy University has a satellite campus in Phenix City.

As of 2020, the mayor is Eddie N. Lowe, the city's first black mayor elected by the public. The city manager, who holds the task of organizational matters, is Wallace Hunter.

Geography
Phenix City is located at  (32.472822, −85.020121). It is the easternmost settlement in the state of Alabama as well as the Central Time Zone, but it and some other nearby areas unofficially observe Eastern Time, as these areas are part of the metropolitan area of the considerably larger city of Columbus, Georgia, which is in the Eastern Time Zone and adjacent to the city across the Chattahoochee River to the east.

Several major highways run through Phenix City, namely U.S. Routes 80, 280, and 431. U.S. Route 80 runs through the northern and western parts of the city, leading west  to Tuskegee and northeast to Columbus, Georgia. U.S. 280 runs through the western part of the city from northwest to southeast, leading northwest  to Opelika and southeast into Columbus. U.S. 431 runs north to south to the west of the city, concurrent with US 280, which it follows to Opelika, and leads south  to Eufaula.

Climate
The climate in this area is characterized by relatively high temperatures and evenly distributed precipitation throughout the year. According to the Köppen Climate Classification system, Phenix City has a humid subtropical climate, abbreviated "Cfa" on climate maps.

History

What some claim was the last battle of the Civil War, the Battle of Columbus took place on April 16, 1865, in Phenix City, then known as Girard. Union General James Wilson was met with Confederate opposition as he crossed the Chattahoochee River in an attempt to destroy the military industry of Columbus, Georgia.

Today's Phenix City initially began as two towns bordering each other on the North and South. On the south side was Girard, in Russell County, and the town of Brownville, on the north side, which was entirely within Lee County. Because a community in Tuscaloosa County already claimed the name of Brownville, the post office insisted on the name of "Lively". To compound the confusion, the nearby railroad depot was called Knight's Station. Because residents preferred Brownville, on the 1880 U.S. Census, it was listed as both Brownville and Lively. It was formally incorporated by the legislature on February 23, 1883.

Within the decade, the name would be changed to Phenix (or Phenix City), although some misspellings had it as "Phoenix". It was not clear if it was named for Phenix Mills in adjacent Columbus, Georgia, or for the fabled bird. It appeared as Phenix City on the 1890 U.S. Census and was incorporated as such on February 19, 1897, by the state legislature. The City Official website displays the mythical Phoenix. The city's Seal also depicts the Phoenix burning up in its nest. The 'Our Community/History' page confirms the uncertainty behind the name: "Although no definitive source reveals why this name was chosen."

On August 9, 1923, Russell County's neighboring Girard (which made up most of current downtown Phenix City) and Lee County's Phenix City formally merged, keeping the name of Phenix City. Because the consolidated city still remained divided into two counties, in 1932, the Lee County portion was moved entirely into Russell County (also cited for the redraw was to account for population shifts involved in the Auburn University opening and expansion). Lee County received the rural segment at Marvyn as compensation, which was formerly in Russell County's northwest corner.

In 1926, the Russell County portion of Phenix City was designated the second county seat (the seat from 1868 had been at rural Seale). In 1934/35, Phenix City then became the sole county seat.

Phenix City was notorious during the 1940s and 1950s for being a haven for organized crime, prostitution, and gambling. Many of its customers came from the United States Army training center at Fort Benning, Georgia. The leaders of the crime syndicate in Phenix City were Jimmie Matthews and Hoyt Shepherd. Albert Patterson, from Phenix City, was elected to become attorney general of Alabama on a platform of reforming the city, but was shot and killed in 1954 outside his office on 5th Ave, north of 14th Street.   As a result, the city had a negative reputation, and many people still associate this legacy with Phenix City. The Tragedy and the Triumph of Phenix City, Alabama by Margaret Ann Barnes chronicles these events, which led the small town to be known as "Sin City, USA". The bordertown was the subject of an acclaimed film, The Phenix City Story, made in 1955.

In 1955, it won the All-America City Award from the National Municipal League.

Despite the city having been entirely annexed into Russell County in 1932, the growth of the city has spread northward back into Lee County, where it first appeared on 1980 U.S. Census records. , nearly 4,200 residents (out of almost 33,000) reside in the Lee County portion.

Religion
Phenix City is home to many Christian churches. The denominations include:
Protestantism
Baptist
Southern Baptist Convention
United Methodist Church and other Methodist denominations
Seventh-day Adventist
Roman Catholicism
The Church of Jesus Christ of Latter-day Saints

Demographics

2000 census
As of the census of 2000, there were 28,265 people, 11,517 households, and 7,566 families residing in the city. The racial makeup of the city was 52.94% White, 44.97% Black or African American, 0.23% Native American, 0.53% Asian, 0.02% Pacific Islander, 0.56% from other races, and 0.76% from two or more races. 1.49% of the population were Hispanic or Latino of any race.

There were 11,517 households, out of which 31.7% had children under the age of 18 living with them, 39.4% were married couples living together, 22.1% had a female householder with no husband present, and 34.3% were non-families. 30.4% of all households were made up of individuals, and 11.5% had someone living alone who was 65 years of age or older. The average household size was 2.40 and the average family size was 2.99.

In the city, the population was spread out, with 26.3% under the age of 18, 9.6% from 18 to 24, 28.7% from 25 to 44, 21.2% from 45 to 64, and 14.2% who were 65 years of age or older. The median age was 35 years. For every 100 females, there were 86.2 males. For every 100 females age 18 and over, there were 80.4 males.

The median income for a household in the city was $26,720, and the median income for a family was $33,740. Males had a median income of $28,906 versus $21,348 for females. The per capita income for the city was $14,619. About 18.8% of families and 21.3% of the population were below the poverty line, including 29.5% of those under age 18 and 20.6% of those age 65 or over.

2010 census
As of the census of 2010, there were 32,822 people, 13,243 households, and 8,623 families residing in the city. The racial makeup of the city was 48.7% White, 46.6% Black or African American, 0.3% Native American, 0.7% Asian, 0.2% Pacific Islander, 1.4% from other races, and 2.2% from two or more races. 4.0% of the population were Hispanic or Latino of any race.

There were 13,243 households, out of which 31.8% had children under the age of 18 living with them, 36.4% were married couples living together, 23.9% had a female householder with no husband present, and 34.9% were non-families. 30.1% of all households were made up of individuals, and 9.5% had someone living alone who was 65 years of age or older. The average household size was 2.44 and the average family size was 3.03.

In the city, the population was spread out, with 26.9% under the age of 18, 10.4% from 18 to 24, 27.9% from 25 to 44, 23.0% from 45 to 64, and 11.8% who were 65 years of age or older. The median age was 33.1 years. For every 100 females, there were 87.7 males. For every 100 females age 18 and over, there were 86.0 males.

The median income for a household in the city was $33,120, and the median income for a family was $39,417. Males had a median income of $36,827 versus $27,001 for females. The per capita income for the city was $18,883. About 20.3% of families and 23.9% of the population were below the poverty line, including 39.7% of those under age 18 and 13.1% of those age 65 or over.

2020 census

As of the 2020 United States census, there were 38,816 people, 14,716 households, and 9,170 families residing in the city.

Time zone
Unlike the rest of Alabama which lies in the Central Time Zone, Phenix City's proximity to the larger city of neighboring Columbus, Georgia, located in the Eastern Time Zone, and its strong economic links leads Phenix City (including its municipal government) and localities within a  radius (such as Smiths Station) to observe Eastern Time on a de facto basis.

Media
 
There are three radio stations licensed in Phenix City: WHTY (1460 AM), WURY-LP (97.1 FM), & WGSY (100.1 FM).

Sister cities
  Colomiers, France
  Kamenice, Czech Republic
  Västerås, Sweden

In popular culture
The character "Maggot" from E.M. Nathanson's novel The Dirty Dozen was from Phenix City.
The 1955 film The Phenix City Story (directed by Phil Karlson) is a biographical film noir focusing on the rampant crime and corruption in the city (then called "the wickedest city in the United States") and the 1954 murder of newly nominated Alabama Attorney General candidate Albert Patterson.
Ska saxophonist Rolando Alphonso of the Skatalites had a 1960s hit titled "Phenix City"
The town gained attention in 1999 when Phenix City National Little League advanced to the final of the Little League World Series.
The city is mentioned in the film Driving Miss Daisy.
The city is mentioned in the book The Silence of the Lambs in Chapter 12.
The city is mentioned as a former bootlegging city by the character played by Robert Mitchum in the film Thunder Road.
The 2008 novel Wicked City by Ace Atkins is set in Phenix City.
The city is mentioned once in the Riley Green song, "Georgia Time".
The 466th episode of The Dollop examines the history of the city.

Notable people
 Jo Jo Benson, former R&B singer
 Hugh A. Bentley, helped reform Phenix City in the 1950s
 Simeon Castille, former NFL cornerback
 Wally Chambers, former NFL defensive tackle
 Rodney Cooper, basketball player
 Harvey Glance, track-and-field star in 1976 Summer Olympics and 1979 Pan-Am Games
 Aidan Gould, child actor
 Nolan Gould, child actor
 Bishop Harris, former head coach of North Carolina Central University football team
 Freddie Hart, country singer who wrote and recorded "Phenix City"; section of 13th Street named Freddie Hart Parkway in his honor
 Tim Hudson, Major League Baseball pitcher
 Billy Jackson, former NFL running back
 Van Jakes, former NFL cornerback
 James Joseph, former NFL running back
 Kasey Kiker, Major League Baseball player
 Boise Kimber, American Baptist minister and civil rights activist
 Ed King, former NFL offensive guard
 Herm Lee, former NFL offensive tackle
 Eddie Lowe, former Canadian Football League linebacker and current mayor of Phenix City
 Woodrow Lowe, former NFL player, College Football Hall of Fame member
 Triandos Luke, former NFL wide receiver
 Joe Meriweather, former NBA player
 John Malcolm Patterson, Governor of Alabama from 1959 to 1963
 Colby Rasmus, Major League Baseball outfielder
 David Ray, former NFL placekicker
 Tommie Robinson, football coach 
 Jimmie Spheeris, singer-songwriter
 Rob Spivery, former basketball player and current head basketball coach at Southern University
 Rufus Stokes, inventor
 Ucambre Williams, football player
 Bruce Stephens, former NFL Wide Receiver

Gallery

References

External links

 Official website
 The Fall and Rise of Phenix City from The Malefactor's Register
 Up from the Ashes: The Rebirth of Phenix City, a public TV documentary
 

Cities in Alabama
Populated places established in 1883
Cities in Russell County, Alabama
Cities in Lee County, Alabama
County seats in Alabama
Columbus metropolitan area, Georgia
Auburn metropolitan area, Alabama
Alabama populated places on the Chattahoochee River